Soviet-occupied Afghanistan may refer to:
 Democratic Republic of Afghanistan (1978–1987)
 Soviet–Afghan War (1979–1989)
 Soviet invasion of Afghanistan (1979)

See also 
 Afghan Civil War (1989–1992)
 Afghan Civil War (1992–1996)
 Afghan Civil War (1996–2001)
 Afghanistan conflict (1978–present)
 Republic of Afghanistan (1987–1992)
 Saur Revolution (1978)
 United States invasion of Afghanistan (2001)
 War in Afghanistan (disambiguation)